The Central American and Caribbean Cross Country Championships (Spanish: Campeonato Centroamericano y del Caribe de Campo Traviesa) was an annual Cross country running competition organized by the CACAC for athletes representing the countries of its member associations.  The competition was established in 1983 following a proposal of Wallace Williams from the Virgin Islands, then secretary of the CACAC.  The rationale was that also smaller countries without adequate athletics' facilities could host such an event.  The approval for the competitions' implementation was given during the 1982 CACAC meeting in Havana.  The first championships were to take place in 1983 on the Virgin Islands, but because of the US invasion of Grenada, the event was postponed and relocated to Puerto Rico.

In the beginning, there were featured races for senior men (about 12 km) and women (6–8 km), and later, from the year 2000 on, also for junior athletes.  In addition, there were separate team competitions.  The 2000 event was held in conjunction with the South American Cross Country Championships.

Editions
The 2002 edition scheduled for Oranjestad, as well as the 2004 edition scheduled for Kingston, were cancelled.  Finally, in 2005, the competition was continued as NACAC Cross Country Championships under the auspices of the NACAC.

Results 
The results for the Mexican athletes were published by the Federation of Mexican Athletics Associations (FMAA).  Further results were compiled from other sources.

Men Senior Individual 

†: In 2000, the event was held in conjunction with the South American Cross Country Championships, where the medallists were extracted from. Winner was João N'Tyamba from  who was invited to participate out of competition in 37:11. Daniel Lopes Ferreira from  came in 2nd in 37:14 to become South American Champion.

Men Senior Team

Women Senior Individual

Women Senior Team

Boys Junior Individual

Boys Junior Team

Girls Junior Individual

Girls Junior Team

See also
IAAF World Cross Country Championships
NACAC Cross Country Championships
South American Cross Country Championships

References

External links
World Junior Athletics History

Cross country running competitions
Recurring sporting events established in 1983
Recurring sporting events disestablished in 2003
CACAC competitions
Athletics team events
Defunct athletics competitions